Polesia region ( - Paleskaja voblasć) was an administrative division in the Soviet Belarus. It was created on January 15, 1938. It included the territories of eastern Polesia and consisted of 15 raions. The center of Polesia Voblast was the town of Mozyr.

On January 8, 1954, the Voblast was liquidated and became part of Homyel Voblast.

External links
Administrative divisions of Belarus: history (Russian)

Former subdivisions of Belarus
States and territories established in 1938